Adriano Lombardi (7 August 1945 – 30 November 2007), nicknamed il rosso di Ponsacco, was an Italian football player and a football coach, mostly known for his time spent at Avellino.

Career
He played as a midfielder with many teams, in particular Perugia, Como and Avellino.

In November 2007, at the age of 62, he died of amyotrophic lateral sclerosis, in Mercogliano.

In his honour, the number 10 Avellino jersey, worn by Lombardi during his time for the "lupi", has been retired.

On 9 June 2011 Stadio Partenio has been dedicated to Lombardi.

See also
amyotrophic lateral sclerosis
Retired numbers in association football

References

External links

1945 births
2007 deaths
Italian footballers
Serie A players
Serie B players
Serie C players
Neurological disease deaths in Campania
Deaths from motor neuron disease
ACF Fiorentina players
Empoli F.C. players
U.S. Avellino 1912 players
Italian football managers
Como 1907 players
A.C. Perugia Calcio players
Piacenza Calcio 1919 players
U.S. Avellino 1912 managers
Benevento Calcio managers
Calcio Lecco 1912 players
A.C. Cesena players
FC Chiasso players
FC Chiasso managers
Association football midfielders